CulverLand is a temporary artwork and functioning game in Culver City, California, United States, created by John Derevlany. It was funded by an arts grant from the City of Culver City, California, and installed as part of the 2010 Indiecade, the International Festival of Independent Games. 

In "CulverLand," pedestrians are the playing pieces. Players move forward on the game board based on the colors of passing cars. The colors of the gameboard in "CulverLand" - black, white, gray/silver, blue, red, and green - are based on the six most popular car colors in North America. 

"CulverLand" is a sprawling work of Minimalism, inspired by Piet Mondrian and, more importantly, Milton Bradley (they made the game "Candyland"). It is meant to celebrate the play grid inherent in all games (both electronic and non-electronic), as well as finally finding a fun use for all this traffic we have to deal with every day. "CulverLand" is located in Culver City, California, on the sidewalk just east of 9400 Culver Blvd. (near the Culver Hotel). "Culverland" is 90 feet long, by 18 feet wide. Each square on the gameboard is 6 ft. X 6 ft. Most of the squares were installed with an eco-friendly, temporary marking paint called EZ-Paint. Lettering and logos were applied with giant, hand-cut plastic stencils and non-toxic Mythic paint.

"CulverLand" is scheduled for removal November 1, 2010.

References

Official CulverLand Website

External links
Los Angeles Times
NBC Los Angeles, Events
Culver City's Website

Art in California
Outdoor games